The 1922 Hong Kong Sanitary Board election was supposed to be held on 28 September 1919 for one of the two unofficial seats in the Sanitary Board of Hong Kong.

Only ratepayers who were included in the Special and Common Jury Lists of the years or ratepayers who are exempted from serving on Juries on account of their professional avocations, unofficial members of the Executive or Legislative Council, or categories of profession were entitled to vote at the election.

Dr. F. M. G. Ozorio sought for third term without being uncontested.

References

Hong Kong
1922 in Hong Kong
Sanitary
Uncontested elections
September 1922 events
Hong Kong